Yuantong station, also known as the Nanjing International Expo Centre Station, is an interchange station between Line 2 and Line 10 of the Nanjing Metro.

The theme of this station's decorations is Lantern Festival.

Around the station
 Nanjing International Expo Center

References

Railway stations in Jiangsu
Nanjing Metro stations
Railway stations in China opened in 2005